Trapezites phigalia, commonly known as the heath ochre or phigalia skipper, is a species of butterfly in the family Hesperiidae. It is endemic to Australia, where it occurs in New South Wales, Queensland, South Australia and Victoria.

Description 
From above, the forewings each exhibit a black central area containing three yellow spots, a median yellow spot near the dorsum, and a subapical band of three pale spots, while the hindwings each exhibit a broad yellow-orange central band. From below, the forewings exhibit a central black patch and markings as above, while the hindwings are dotted with 10 brown circular markings, irregular in shape. Adult males and females appear similar, though the yellow spots on the wings are larger on females.

Behaviour and life cycle 
Adults fly fast and close to the ground, readily feeding at flowers. Adult males engage in hilltopping and establish territories within a meter of the ground. Adult females lay their eggs singly on the undersides of the leaves of the species' host plants, which include several species of mat-rushes: Lomandra densiflora, Lomandra fibrata, Lomandra filiformis, Lomandra glauca, Lomandra nana, and Lomandra obliqua. Once hatched, the larvae construct a vertical shelter from silk and debris at the base of the host plant, resting in their shelter during the day and emerging to feed at night. Larvae overwinter inside their larval shelters. Pupation may occur inside the larval shelter or in a curled dead leaf near the base of the host plant. There is a single generation each year, with adults emerging primarily in October and November.

References 

Butterflies of Australia
Insects of Australia
Hesperiidae
Trapezitinae
Butterflies described in 1868
Taxa named by William Chapman Hewitson